Jacques Famery (July 20, 1923 – January 18, 2014) was a French film actor.

Selected filmography

 My First Love (1945) - René
 Son of France (1946) - François
 Bichon (1948) - Jacques Fontange
  (1948) - Georges
  (1949) - Roger
 Le Furet (1950) - Achille Terrigny
 Menace de mort (1950)
 Bibi Fricotin (1951) - Le reporter
 This Age Without Pity (1952) - Léon
 Puccini (1953) - Antonio Puccini
 The Sparrows of Paris (1953)
 The Lady of the Camellias (1953)- Un ami d'Armand
  (1956) - Jean Roussel
  (1957) - Un clown / A clown
  (1961)
 The Gendarmes of St. Tropez (1964) - Prince
 The Gorillas (1964)
 Les grandes vacances (1967)
 Finalement... (1971)
 Les chats bottés (1971) - Môman
 7 fois... par jour (1971)
 Le diable est parmi nous (1972)
 The Rebels (Quelques arpents de neige) (1972)
 Don't Push It (Pousse mais pousse égal) (1975)
 La fleur aux dents (1976)
 Let's Talk About Love (Parlez-nous d'amour) (1976)
 The Little Girl Who Lives Down the Lane (1976) - Bank Clerk
 Bernie and the Gang (1977)
 Tête à claques (1982)
 Enigma (1982)
 Les Rois du gag (1985)
 Lévy et Goliath (1987)
 La Soif de l'or (1993) - Un acheteur (final film role)

References

Bibliography
 Jean-Louis Ginibre, John Lithgow & Barbara Cady. Ladies Or Gentlemen: A Pictorial History of Male Cross-dressing in the Movies. Filipacchi Publishing, 2005.

External links

1923 births
2014 deaths
20th-century French male actors
French male film actors
People from Vernon, Eure